On and On or On & On may refer to:

Albums 
On and On (Jack Johnson album), 2003
On & On (Jennifer Holliday album), 1995
On and On (All-4-One album), 1999
On and On, by Eagle & Hawk
On and On, by The Fat Boys

Songs 
"On and On" (Gladys Knight & the Pips song), 1974
"On and On" (Stephen Bishop song), 1977
"On and On" (VIXX song), 2013
"On & On" (Erykah Badu song), 1997
"On & On" (Illy song), 2013
"On and On" (Agnes song), a 2008 song by Agnes Carlsson
"On and On", by Flo Rida from Only One Flo (Part 1)
"On and On", by The Answer from Everyday Demons
"On and On", by Boy Kill Boy from Civilian
"On and On", by Chasen from That Was Then, This Is Now
"On and On", by Curtis Harding from Face Your Fear
"On and On", by Do from the self-titled album
"On and On", by Estelle from The 18th Day
"On and On", by Hikaru Utada from This Is the One
"On and On", by Jay Sean from Me Against Myself
"On and On", by The Longpigs from The Sun Is Often Out
"On and On", by Michael Schenker Group from MSG
"On and On", by Raven from Stay Hard
"On and On", by Robert Earl Keen
"On and On", by Steriogram from Schmack! 
"On and On", by Shyheim from AKA the Rugged Child
"On and On", non-album single by Jesse Saunders
"On and On (Lodestar)", a 1995 song by Crash Vegas
"On and On", a 2002 song by 20syl from the mixtape 1son2rue by Cut Killer
"On and On", a 2015 song by Cartoon (ft. Daniel Levi)
"On & On", by Eamon from I Don't Want You Back
"On & On", by Joey Badass from B4.Da.$$
"On & On", by Mike Stud featuring Conrad Sewell from Closer
"On & On", by Missy Elliott from The Cookbook
"On & On", a 2013 song by Boyfriend from the EP Witch
"On & On", a song from Inna's Hot (2009)

See also
"On and On and On", a 1980 song by ABBA
"And On and On", a song by Janet Jackson from Any Time, Any Place
"On and On and On", a song by Catch 22 and Streetlight Manifesto
On And On Records, a French record label